Qu Chuxiao (born 28 December 1994) is a Chinese actor and singer. He is best known for his roles as Chang An, a shadow assassin, in the 2018 Chinese television series Bloody Romance,  Liu Qi in the 2019 Chinese sci-fi film The Wandering Earth,  and Zhang Wansen in the 2022 Chinese television series Shining for One Thing.

Early life and education
Qu received his bachelor's degree from the Central Academy of Drama in 2017.

Career
Qu made his acting debut in 2016 with a leading role in the romance web series My Fair Lady. He then starred in the historical fiction dramas Ruyi's Royal Love in the Palace, playing Yongqi, and Rule the World, playing Dorgon. In 2018, Qu starred in the wuxia web series Bloody Romance, which was a commercial success and passed 600 million views online by August 2018,  playing the male lead role Chang An, a shadow assassin. Qu gained acclaim for his performance and experienced a rise in popularity.

Qu debuted on the big screen with a minor role in the comedy film Father and Son which premiered in 2017. He then starred in the youth drama films Twenty, Graduating, and Oh Boy!. 

In 2019, Qu starred in China's first interstellar science fiction film The Wandering Earth, playing the lead role. The film was a major success and became the fifth highest-grossing film of all time in China. Forbes China listed Qu under their 30 Under 30 Asia 2019 list which consisted of 30 influential people under 30 years old who have had a substantial effect in their fields.

He then starred in the 2021 films Love Will Tear Us Apart (2021 film) as Lu Qinyang (lead role), with the film becoming a major commercial success, and The Yinyang Master as Yuan Boya. 

In 2022, he starred in the romance, sci-fi, mystery, fantasy and coming-of-age television series Shining for One Thing as Zhang Wansen (lead role), which gained immediate success in China and abroad.

Controversy
In April 2020, a netizen claiming to be Qu's ex-girlfriend published photographs claiming that she had been physically abused by Qu when they were dating. Although the allegations were subsequently debunked by his lawyers as untrue, another netizen published photographs in Dec 2020 with similar claims alleging that she had been physically abused and suffered a miscarriage while in a relationship with him. Qu's lawyers subsequently debunked the allegations again.

Filmography

Film

Television series

Soundtrack

Awards and nominations

See Also
Qu (surname 屈)

References

External links 
 

1994 births
Living people
Male actors from Sichuan
Central Academy of Drama alumni
People from Meishan
21st-century Chinese male actors
Chinese male film actors
Chinese male television actors